The 2007–08 Piacenza Calcio season was the club's 89th season in existence and the club's fifth consecutive in the second division of Italian football. In addition to the domestic league, Piacenza participated in this season's edition of the Coppa Italia.

Competitions

Overview

Serie B

League table

Results summary

Results by round

Matches

Coppa Italia

References

External links

Piacenza Calcio 1919 seasons
Piacenza